Teresa Polias (born 16 May 1990) is an Australian soccer player, who played for Sydney FC in the Australian W-League.

Personal life
Polias was born in 1990 in Darlinghurst, New South Wales in a family of Greek descent. She grew up in the southern suburbs of Sydney.

As well as playing football, Polias works full-time as a primary school teacher currently at McCallums Hill Public School.

Club career

Polias made her debut against Melbourne Victory on 25 October 2008.

Polias was named Sydney FC player of the year in the 2011–12 W-League season.

Polias was a vital member of the Sydney FC Women's team who won the 2012–13 W-League Championship; during the winning season she played every single minute of every single match including the Grand Final.

Polias scored her first ever W-League goal in a 3–2 win over Melbourne City, with a long range effort which rocketed straight into the top corner.

Polias was captain of the Sydney FC Women's team who won the 2018–19 W-League Championship; during the winning season she played every single minute of every single match including Grand Final.

In August 2021, Polias took a break from football to start a family and to decide if she wants to continue playing.

International career
Polias has represented Australia in the Young Matilda's starting 11 on many occasions, having travelled to Europe and Asia on numerous occasions.

References

1990 births
Living people
Australian women's soccer players
Central Coast Mariners FC (A-League Women) players
Sydney FC (A-League Women) players
A-League Women players
2015 FIFA Women's World Cup players
Australia women's international soccer players
Women's association football midfielders
People educated at Endeavour Sports High School
Australian people of Greek descent
Soccer players from Sydney